Polisportiva Castellarano Calcio is an Italian association football club located in Castellarano, Emilia-Romagna. It currently plays in Eccellenza Emilia–Romagna.

History 
The club was founded in 2000.

The highest category in which it has played is Serie D.

Colors and badge 
Its colors are red and blue.

Honours
 Regional Coppa Italia Emilia–Romagna:
Winners 1: 2011–12

External links
Official web

Football clubs in Italy
Football clubs in Emilia-Romagna
Association football clubs established in 2000
2000 establishments in Italy